An upstream open reading frame (uORF) is an open reading frame (ORF) within the 5' untranslated region (5'UTR) of an mRNA. uORFs can regulate eukaryotic gene expression. Translation of the uORF typically inhibits downstream expression of the primary ORF. However, in some genes such as yeast GCN4, translation of specific uORFs may increase translation of the main ORF. In bacteria, uORFs are called leader peptides and were originally discovered on the basis of their impact on the regulation of genes involved in the synthesis or transport of amino acids.

Approximately 50% of human genes contain uORFs in their 5'UTR, and when present, these cause reductions in protein expression. Human peptides derived from translated uORFs can be detected from cellular material with a mass spectrometer.

See also 
5'UTR
Eukaryotic translation
Leaky scanning

References 

Gene expression
Molecular biology